Khunzakh is a rural locality (a selo) and the administrative center of Khunzakhsky District in the Republic of Dagestan, Russia, located in the North Caucasus mountains  above sea level. Population:

History

It is widely accepted among historians that in the period of 5th to 12th century AD, Khunzakh, known as Humraj, was the capital of Sarir, a powerful Christian state in the mountains of Caucasus.

Khunzakh served as the capital of the Caucasian Avar Khanate from the early 13th century until the Caucasian War which ended with the annexation of the khanate into Russia in 1864. During the Russian Empire, the settlement was the administrative capital of the Avarsky Okrug.

Culture
Khunzakh is considered the cultural heart of the Caucasian Avar region.

Notable Natives 
Heroes of Socialist Labor:

 Khazha Murtuzalievna Lokalova (December 15, 1920-2001), teacher of the Khunzakh secondary school (Dagestan ASSR), Hero of Socialist Labor (1960).
 Magomed Makhulovich Makhulov (February 23, 1915 - April 11, 2021), Soviet statesman, Hero of Socialist Labor (April 8, 1971).

Political and military figures:
 Abukhosro, the ruler of the state formation Khunzakh nutsalstvo in the middle of the VIII century.
 Saratan I (XI century), nutsal (ruler) of the state formation Avar nutsalstvo.
 Surakat I, Avar Nutsal, who ruled according to approximately one data, in the XI century, according to others, in the XII century or in the XIII century.
 Bayar II, (XII century) - the son of the Avar nutsal and Surakat.
 Andunik, also Amir-Sultan, (end of the 12th century - beginning of the 13th century) - the son of Baisar, the Avar nutsal.
 Malik Saratan, also Saratan II is the son and heir of Amir-Sultan.
 Andunik I, the ruler (nutsal) of the Avar nutsaldom in the second half of the 15th century.
 Muhammad-Shamkhal - Avar Nutsal. Ruled from 1578 to 1589
 Umma Khan IV - (at the end of 1735 or at the beginning of 1736) - the ruler of the Avar Khanate at the beginning of the 18th century
 Muhammad-nutsal IV - (1730 or 1731-1774), ruler of the Avar Khanate from 1735 to 1774.
 Umma Khan of Avar, nicknamed the Great or Mad (1761 or 1762 - March 22, 1801) - Avar Nutsal, ruler of the Avar Khanate from 1774 to 1801.
 Hiriyasul Alibek - (beginning of the 19th century - 1839), a military leader of the North Caucasian Imamate.
 Akhberdil Mohammed (1803 - June 18, 1843), General and Mudir of Imam Shamil.
 Hadji Murad - (1818 - May 5, 1852) - military leader, Naib of Imam Shamil.
 Fataali Avar (? - October 1877), military leader, naib of Imam Shamil.
 Maksud Alikhanov-Avarskiy (1846-1907), lieutenant general, governor of the Tiflis province.
 Zagid Gadzhiev (1898-1971) - poet, translator and playwright, editor. People's poet of the Dagestan ASSR.
 Zagidat Magomedbekova (1920-1999), Soviet and Georgian Caucasian linguist, Dagestanologist.

Panoramic views

References

Rural localities in Khunzakhsky District